Stephen Hickman (April 9, 1949 – July 16, 2021) was an American artist, illustrator, sculptor, and author.

Biography
Hickman's professional career was launched in 1972 when he got a job creating T-shirt designs for Shirt Explosion in Lanham, Maryland. Hickman was given virtually unlimited artistic freedom. His entry into book illustration came in 1974, when Neal Adams of Continuity Studios introduced Hickman to Charles Volpe, art editor at Ace Books. Volpe bought the printing rights of items from Hickman's portfolio, and later commissioned paintings which were used for reprints of Ace Doubles in the Classics of Science-Fiction series. Hickman then became a full-time artist. His most prominent work is Space Fantasy Stamps, a series of science fiction and fantasy postage stamps made for the United States Postal Service. These stamps are a series of five scenes that depict space travel.

Awards
 1994 Hugo Award, for Best Original Art Work
 Six Chesley Awards

References

1949 births
2021 deaths
Fantasy artists
Hugo Award-winning artists
American speculative fiction artists
Science fiction artists
Role-playing game artists
Artists from Washington, D.C.
Writers from Washington, D.C.